Saint Joseph Central High School was a private, college preparatory, Roman Catholic high school in Pittsfield, Massachusetts.  Saint Joseph offered a co-educational intensive college preparatory curriculum to students in grades 9 through 12. SJCHS had a strong international student community with students from Korea, China, Austria, and Spain, but did not offer boarding facilities. International students live with local host families.  Former principal Francis X. Foley announced his resignation in June 2013, and has been replaced with Dr. Amy Gelinas. The School closed in June 2017.

Background
Saint Joseph Central High School was established as Saint Joseph Academy by the Sisters of St. Joseph in 1897 in downtown Pittsfield.  It moved to its present location, 22 Maplewood Ave, in 1942.

Athletics
Saint Joseph offered various varsity sports. Boys teams included soccer, basketball, baseball, and lacrosse. Girls teams included volleyball, soccer, basketball and softball,  Co-ed teams included cross-country (running), alpine skiing, swimming, tennis, track and field, golf, ice hockey, and bowling (club).

Notes and references

External links
Dead Link School Website
  Diocese of Springfield

Buildings and structures in Pittsfield, Massachusetts
Catholic secondary schools in Massachusetts
Schools in Berkshire County, Massachusetts
Educational institutions established in 1897
1897 establishments in Massachusetts